The Bona Allen Mansion, also known as Bona Allen House, at 395 Main St. in Buford, Georgia, in Gwinnett County.  It was listed on the National Register of Historic Places in 1983. It was built in 1911. It was it home of Bona Allen, Sr.

The listing included eight contributing buildings, including a smokehouse.

Entrepreneur Steve Siebold and/or his companies bought the mansion in 2015.

See also 
 Bona Allen Company

References

National Register of Historic Places in Gwinnett County, Georgia
Buildings and structures completed in 1911